The Tampa Bay Lightning (colloquially known as the Bolts) are a professional ice hockey team based in Tampa, Florida. They compete in the National Hockey League (NHL) as a member of the Atlantic Division in the Eastern Conference. They play their home games at Amalie Arena in Downtown Tampa.

The Lightning have won three Stanley Cup championships: 2004, 2020, and 2021. They also reached the Stanley Cup Finals in 2015 and in 2022. The team is owned by Jeffrey Vinik, and the general manager is Julien BriseBois. Jon Cooper has served as head coach since March 2013, and is the longest-tenured active head coach in the NHL.

Franchise history

Early years (1992–2000)

Bringing hockey to Tampa
In the late 1980s, the NHL announced it would expand. Two rival groups from the Tampa Bay Area decided to bid for a franchise: a St. Petersburg-based group fronted by future Hartford Whalers/Carolina Hurricanes owners Peter Karmanos and Jim Rutherford, and a Tampa-based group fronted by Phil Esposito and his brother Tony, both members of the Hockey Hall of Fame. One of the Esposito group's key backers, the Pritzker family, backed out a few months before the bid, to be replaced by a consortium of Japanese businesses headed by Kokusai Green, a golf course and resort operator. Although it appeared on paper that the Karmanos/Rutherford group had more financial resources, it only wanted to pay $29 million before the game began. In contrast, the Esposito/Kokusai Green group was one of the few groups willing to pay the full $50 million expansion fee up front. The Esposito group would win the expansion franchise on December 6, 1990, and name the team the Lightning, after Tampa Bay's status as the "Lightning Capital of North America."

Phil Esposito assigned himself president and general manager, while Tony became chief scout. Terry Crisp, who played for the Philadelphia Flyers when they won two Stanley Cups in the mid-1970s and coached the Calgary Flames to a Stanley Cup in 1989, was tapped as the first head coach. Phil Esposito also hired former teammates from the Boston Bruins of the 1970s, including former linemate Wayne Cashman as an assistant coach and former Bruin trainer John "Frosty" Forristal as the team's trainer. The inaugural team photo has him flanked by Cashman and player Ken Hodge, Jr., son of his other Bruins' linemate.

In 1991, Angus Montagu, 12th Duke of Manchester announced that a company of which he was a director would raise millions of dollars in investments in the Lightning, but his plans were unsuccessful and he was later convicted of wire fraud.

The Lightning played their first preseason game in September 1992 against the Minnesota North Stars, and then turned heads later that preseason when Manon Rhéaume became the first woman to play in an NHL game, which also made her the first woman to play in any of the major professional North American sports leagues. She played for the Lightning against the St. Louis Blues, and stopped seven of nine shots.

The Lightning played their first regular-season game on October 7, 1992, in Tampa's tiny 11,000-seat Expo Hall at the Florida State Fairgrounds. They surprised the visiting Chicago Blackhawks, winning 7–3 with four goals by little-known Chris Kontos. The team rose to the top of the Campbell Conference's Norris Division within a month, behind Kontos' initial torrid scoring pace and a breakout season by forward Brian Bradley. This was, at the time, one of the best-ever showings by an NHL expansion team. Bradley's 42 goals gave Tampa Bay fans optimism for the next season; it would be a team record until the 2006–07 season.

The following season saw the Lightning shift to the Eastern Conference's Atlantic Division, as well as move into the Florida Suncoast Dome (a building originally designed for baseball) in St. Petersburg, which was reconfigured for hockey and renamed the "ThunderDome." The team acquired goaltender Daren Puppa, left wing goal scorer Petr Klima, and veteran forward Denis Savard. While Puppa's play resulted in a significant improvement in goals allowed (from 332 to 251), Savard was long past his prime and Klima's scoring was offset by his defensive lapses. The Lightning finished last in the Atlantic Division in 1993–94 with a record of 30–43–11 for 71 points. Another disappointing season followed in the lockout-shortened 1994–95 season with a record of 17–28–3 for 37 points.

On-ice and off-ice struggles
In their fourth season, 1995–96, backed by Bradley's team-leading 79 points, second-year forward Alexander Selivanov's 31 goals, and Roman Hamrlik's All-Star year on defense, the Lightning finally qualified for the playoffs, posting a 38–32–12 record for 88 points, ahead of the defending Stanley Cup champion New Jersey Devils for the eighth spot in the Eastern Conference by a single win. Due to his stellar play in net, Puppa was named a finalist for the Vezina Trophy (losing out to Jim Carey of the Washington Capitals). Playing the Philadelphia Flyers, a team seen as a Stanley Cup contender, in the first round, the Lightning split the opening two games in Philadelphia before taking Game 3 in overtime before a ThunderDome crowd of 28,183. This was the largest crowd for an NHL game, a record that stood until the 2003 Heritage Classic in Edmonton; and it still stands today as the largest crowd at a Stanley Cup playoffs game. An injury to Puppa in that game, however, would see the Lightning lose the next three games and the series.

The Lightning moved into a new arena in downtown Tampa, the Ice Palace (later the St. Pete Times Forum, Tampa Bay Times Forum and now Amalie Arena) for the 1996–97 season. They had acquired goal-scorer Dino Ciccarelli from the Detroit Red Wings during the 1996 off-season, and he did not disappoint, scoring 35 goals while Chris Gratton notched another 30 goals. The team appeared destined for another playoff appearance, but suffered a devastating rash of injuries. Puppa developed back trouble that kept him out of all but six games during the season; he would only play a total of 50 games from 1996 until his retirement in 2000. Bradley also lost time to a series of concussions that would limit him to a total of 49 games from 1996 until his retirement in December 1999. Center John Cullen developed non-Hodgkin lymphoma, and missed the last 12 games of the 1996–97 season; he would eventually be forced to retire in 1999. Decimated by these ailments, the Lightning narrowly missed the playoffs. They would not tally as much as 60 points again for five years.

Most of the Lightning's early stars were gone by the 1998–99 season due to free agency and a series of ill-advised trades. Crisp was fired 11 games into the 1997–98 season and replaced by Jacques Demers. Though Demers had presided over the resurgence of the Detroit Red Wings in the 1980s and helmed a Stanley Cup run with the Montreal Canadiens in 1993, he was unable to change the team's fortunes and the Lightning ended up losing 55 games. That team's .268 winning percentage is still the worst in franchise history.

By most accounts, the Lightning's plunge to the bottom of the NHL was due to inattentive ownership by Kokusai Green. Rumors abounded as early as the team's second season that the Lightning were on the brink of bankruptcy and that the team was part of a money laundering scheme for the yakuza (Japanese crime families). Its scouting operation consisted of Tony Esposito and several satellite dishes. The Internal Revenue Service investigated the team in 1994 and 1995, and nearly threatened to put a tax lien on the franchise for $750,000 in back taxes. The situation led longtime NHL broadcaster and writer Stan Fischler to call the Lightning a "skating vaudeville show."

Even in their first playoff season, the team was awash in red ink and Kokusai Green was looking to sell the team; however its asking price of $230 million for the team and the lease with the Ice Palace deterred buyers. A possible sale was further hampered by the team's murky ownership structure; many team officials (including Crisp) did not know who really owned the team. Kokusai Green's owner, Takashi Okubo, had never met with the Espositos or with NHL officials in person prior to being awarded the Lightning franchise, and never watched his team play during his seven years as owner.

Nearly all of Kokusai Green's investment in the team and the Ice Palace came in the form of loans, leaving the team constantly short of cash. At least one prospective buyer pulled out after expressing doubts that Okubo even existed. In fact, the first time anyone connected with the Lightning or the NHL even saw Okubo was in the spring of 1998. Esposito was forced into several trades just to keep the team above water. The team's financial situation was a considerable concern to NHL officials; rumors surfaced that the NHL was seriously considering taking control of the team if Okubo failed to find a buyer by the summer of 1998.

Forbes wrote an article in late 1997 calling the Lightning a financial nightmare, with a debt equal to 236% of its value, the highest of any major North American sports franchise. Even though the Ice Palace was built for hockey and the Lightning were the only major tenant, Forbes called the team's deal with the arena a lemon since it would not result in much revenue for 30 years. It was also behind on paying state sales taxes and federal payroll taxes.

Finally, in 1998, Kokusai Green found a buyer. Although William Davidson, longtime owner of the Detroit Pistons of the National Basketball Association (NBA), was thought to be the frontrunner, the buyer turned out to be insurance tycoon and motivational speaker Art Williams, who previously owned the Birmingham Barracudas of the Canadian Football League (CFL). The team was $102 million in debt at the time the sale closed. Williams knew very little about hockey, but was very visible and outspoken, and immediately pumped an additional $6 million into the team's payroll. He also cleared most of the debt from the Kokusai Green era. After taking control, Williams publicly assured the Espositos that their jobs were safe, only to fire them two games into the 1998–99 season. He then gave Demers complete control of hockey operations as both coach and general manager. The Lightning drafted Vincent Lecavalier first overall in 1998, a player who would be a cornerstone of the team for years to come.

Williams was widely seen as being in over his head. Early in the 1998–99 season, the Lightning lost ten games in a row, all but ending any chance of making the playoffs. They ended up losing 54 games that year, more than the expansion Nashville Predators.

Return to respectability
By the spring of 1999, Williams had seen enough. He had not attended a game in some time because "this team broke my heart". He lost $20 million in the 1998–99 season alone, as much money in one year as he had estimated he could have reasonably lost in five years. Williams sold the team for $115 million—$2 million less than he had paid for the team a year earlier—to Detroit Pistons owner William Davidson, who had almost bought the team a year earlier. Along with the sale, the Lightning acquired a new top minor league affiliate; Davidson also owned the Detroit Vipers of the now-defunct International Hockey League.

Davidson remained in Detroit, but appointed Tom Wilson as team president to handle day-to-day management of the team. Wilson immediately fired Demers, who despite his best efforts (and fatherly attitude toward Lecavalier) was unable to overcome the damage from the Kokusai Green ownership. Wilson persuaded Ottawa Senators general manager (and former Vipers GM) Rick Dudley to take over as the Lightning's new general manager; Dudley, in turn, brought Vipers coach Steve Ludzik in as the team's new head coach. Wilson, Dudley and Ludzik had helped make the Vipers one of the premier minor league hockey franchises, having won a Turner Cup in only their third season in Detroit (the team had originally been based in Salt Lake City).

St. Louis–Lecavalier era (2000–2013)
However, as had been the case with Demers, the damage from the last few seasons under Kokusai Green was too much for Ludzik to overcome. Even with a wholesale transfer of talent from Detroit to Tampa (a move that eventually doomed the Vipers, which folded along with the IHL in 2001), the Lightning lost 54 games in 1999–2000 and 52 in 2000–01, becoming the first team in NHL history to post four straight 50-loss seasons. The lone bright spots in those years were the blossoming of Lecavalier and Brad Richards into NHL stars. Ludzik was replaced in early 2001 by career NHL assistant John Tortorella. The March 5 trade deadline offered another glimmer of hope when the team acquired hold-out goaltender Nikolai Khabibulin from the Phoenix Coyotes for three players and a draft pick.

The 2001–02 season, Tortorella's first full year behind the bench, saw some improvement. Martin St. Louis was having a breakout season when he broke his leg in game number 47 and was lost for the remainder of the season. Khabibulin recorded a shut out at the NHL All-Star Game but was not named its MVP, by all accounts due to the game's voting protocol. By mid-February, the Lightning were well out of playoff contention and were sinking under a rash of injuries. Dudley, who had guaranteed a playoff berth before the season, was fired and replaced by his assistant, Jay Feaster. Still the Lightning showed some signs of life, earning more than 60 points for the first time since 1997. Tortorella stripped Lecavalier of the captaincy due to contract negotiations that had made the young center miss the start of the season.

Two dream seasons and first Stanley Cup championship
With a young core of players led by Vincent Lecavalier, Brad Richards, Martin St. Louis and Fredrik Modin, the Lightning were thought to be very close to respectability. However, they arrived somewhat earlier than expected in 2002–03. The young team was led by the goaltending of Nikolai Khabibulin and the scoring efforts of Lecavalier, St. Louis, Modin, Richards and Ruslan Fedotenko. Throughout the season, the Lightning battled the Washington Capitals for first place in the Southeast Division. They finished with a record of 36–25–16 for 93 points, breaking the 90-point barrier for the first time in team history. They won the division by just one point, giving them home-ice advantage in their first-round match-up with the Capitals. At season's end, coach Tortorella was recognized for his efforts by being named a finalist for the Jack Adams Award, losing out to Jacques Lemaire of the Minnesota Wild.

In the first round of the playoffs, the Lightning quickly fell two games behind in the series but followed the two losses with four consecutive wins for their first playoff series win in franchise history. However, in the semifinals, they went down in five games to the New Jersey Devils, who went on to win the Stanley Cup.
The Lightning's dramatic improvement continued through the 2003–04 regular season, finishing with a record of 46–22–8–6 for 106 points, second-best in the NHL after the Western Conference's Detroit Red Wings—the first 100-point season in franchise history. The Lightning lost only 20 man-games to injury. In the first round of the playoffs, the Lightning ousted the New York Islanders in five games, with Khabibulin posting shutouts in games 1, 3, and 4.

In the second round, the Lightning faced the Montreal Canadiens; Lecavalier, Richards, and Khabibulin led the team to a four-game sweep of Montreal. Next, they faced the Philadelphia Flyers in the Conference Finals. After a tightly fought seven-game series in which neither team was able to win consecutive games, Fredrik Modin notched the winning goal of the seventh and deciding game, earning the Eastern Conference championship for the Lightning and their first-ever berth in the Stanley Cup Finals.

Their opponent in the final round was the Calgary Flames. The final round also went the full seven games, with the deciding game played in the St. Pete Times Forum on June 7, 2004. This time, Ruslan Fedotenko was the Game 7 hero, scoring both Lightning goals in a 2–1 victory. Brad Richards, who had 26 points in the post-season, won the Conn Smythe Trophy as the most valuable player of the playoffs; the Lightning had won all 31 contests in which he had scored a goal since the opening of the season. Tortorella won the Jack Adams Award as the NHL's Coach of the Year. Only three years after their last of four consecutive seasons of 50 or more losses, and in only their 12th year of existence, the Lightning became the southernmost team ever to win the Stanley Cup. Martin St. Louis led the team and the NHL with 94 points (his 38 goals were fourth-most after the 41 of tied trio Jarome Iginla, Rick Nash and Ilya Kovalchuk), and won the Hart Memorial Trophy as the NHL's most valuable player. St. Louis also won the Lester B. Pearson Award for the NHL's most outstanding player as voted by the NHL Players' Association, and tied the Vancouver Canucks' Marek Malik for the NHL Plus/Minus Award. A season of superlatives was capped with one final accolade, as The Sporting News named GM Jay Feaster as the league's executive of the year for 2003–04.

Post-championship successes and disappointments
The Lightning had to wait a year to defend their title due to the 2004–05 NHL lockout, but in 2005–06, they barely made the playoffs with a record of 43–33–6 for 93 points in a conference where six teams notched 100 or more points. They lost to the Ottawa Senators in five games in the first round of the 2006 playoffs.

During the off-season, the Lightning traded Fredrik Modin and Fredrik Norrena to the Columbus Blue Jackets in exchange for goaltender Marc Denis in an effort to replace the departing John Grahame, who had signed with the Carolina Hurricanes. However, free agent Johan Holmqvist would eventually receive the majority of playing time and most of the club's wins. The first half of 2006–07 was inconsistent for the Lightning, maintaining an 18–19–2 record throughout the first few months. January and February were far better months for the team, going 9–4–0 in January and 9–2–2 in February, driving them back into the playoff race. Fourteen games in March were split even, and on March 16, 2007, Vincent Lecavalier broke the franchise record for most points in a season, with 95 (finishing with 108). The record was previously held by Martin St. Louis, who had set the record in the 2003–04 Stanley Cup-winning year. Lecavalier also broke the franchise's goal-scoring record, finishing with a league-leading 52 goals.

The Lightning were busy during the final weeks before the NHL's trade deadline, acquiring wingers Kyle Wanvig, Stephen Baby and defenseman Shane O'Brien. Former first-round pick Nikita Alexeev was traded on deadline day to the Chicago Blackhawks. Other mid-season additions to the team included Filip Kuba, Luke Richardson and Doug Janik. Veteran Andre Roy, who had won the Stanley Cup with the Lightning in 2004, was claimed off waivers from the Pittsburgh Penguins.

Throughout March, the Lightning had been competing with the Atlanta Thrashers for first place in the Southeast Division. With a chance to overtake the Thrashers one final time and once again become division champions for the third time in team history, on April 6, 2007, in the final week of the regular season, the Lighting suffered a loss to the Florida Panthers, the night before the season finale in Atlanta. That same night, the Thrashers defeated the Carolina Hurricanes and subsequently clinched the division. For the Lightning, this meant having to settle for the seventh seed in the Eastern Conference with a final record of 44–33–5 (93 points). However, the Lightning were eliminated from playoff competition on April 22 after a 3–2 home loss to the New Jersey Devils in Game 6 of the Eastern Conference Quarterfinals.

Following their playoff exit, on August 7, 2007, Absolute Hockey Enterprises, a group led by Doug MacLean, announced it had signed a purchase agreement for the team and the leasehold on the St. Pete Times Forum. MacLean is the former president and general manager of the Columbus Blue Jackets and former head coach for both the Blue Jackets and the Florida Panthers. The group announced it planned to keep the team in Tampa, but the deal collapsed during the 2007–08 season.

Decline
The Lightning struggled to maintain success during the 2007–08 campaign. Although the "Big 3" of Vincent Lecavalier, Martin St. Louis and Brad Richards, along with Vaclav Prospal, had performed up to expectations, they had little consistent play from supporting players.

At the start of the All-Star Break on January 25, 2008, the Lightning had a 20–25–5 record, and with 45 points, were in last place in both the Southeast Division and the Eastern Conference. Only the Los Angeles Kings had a lower point total at this time of the season, with 40 points.

On February 13, 2008, it was announced that Palace Sports & Entertainment had agreed to sell the Lightning to OK Hockey LLC, a group headed by Oren Koules, a producer of the Saw horror movies, and Len Barrie, a former NHL player and real estate developer.

The Lightning were active during the trade deadline, similar to the previous season. More notable trades included Vaclav Prospal's trade to the Philadelphia Flyers in exchange for prospect Alexandre Picard and a conditional draft pick. Additionally, former Conn Smythe Trophy winner Brad Richards and goaltender Johan Holmqvist were traded to the Dallas Stars in exchange for goaltender Mike Smith and forwards Jussi Jokinen and Jeff Halpern, as well as a fourth-round draft pick in 2009. Jan Hlavac, a regular contributor, was also traded, moving to the Nashville Predators in exchange for a seventh-round pick in 2008. Defenseman Dan Boyle was re-signed to a six-year contract extension reportedly worth $40 million.

However, after the trade deadline, the Lightning fared no better than they had throughout the entire season. After the February 26 trade deadline, the Lightning won only five games. Finishing with a 31–42–9 record, with 71 points, they had the highest chance of winning the top overall pick in the 2008 NHL Entry Draft through the draft lottery, which they eventually won on April 7. They would use their first overall pick to select Steven Stamkos of the Ontario Hockey League (OHL)'s Sarnia Sting, who (like Lecavalier before) was expected to become a franchise cornerstone player for years to come.

The Lightning were the worst team on the road in the NHL, winning only 11 games. Another showing of the team's poor play was the difference from the previous season's success in the overtime/shootout periods. In the 2006–07 season, the Lightning had one of the best extra period records, winning 15 games in either overtime or the shootout. However, in the 2007–08 season, they won only three games, losing nine.

Vincent Lecavalier suffered a dislocated shoulder as the result of an open-ice hit from Matt Cooke of the Washington Capitals in the game before the season finale in Atlanta. Lecavalier, who planned on having arthroscopic wrist surgery after the season's ending, would undergo surgery to repair his right shoulder as well. Cooke was fined $2,500 by the NHL for the hit, as Lecavalier did not have possession of the puck at the time. Perhaps the lone bright spot in the season was Lecavalier's winning both the King Clancy Memorial Trophy and the NHL Foundation Player Award for work through his foundation, including a $3 million pledge to All Children's Hospital in St. Petersburg, Florida, for what would become the Vincent Lecavalier Pediatric Cancer and Blood Disorders Center at All Children's Hospital.

Head coach John Tortorella was fired by the Lightning following their worst season since Tortorella was hired. At the time working as an NHL analyst for ESPN, Barry Melrose stated on June 4 during an episode of Pardon the Interruption that he missed coaching and would entertain any NHL coaching offers. He stated, "I miss not having a dog in the fight." On June 23, ESPN reported Melrose had been chosen to be the head coach of the Lightning, beginning in 2008–09. The next day, the Lightning officially introduced him as their new head coach.

On July 4, 2008, Dan Boyle, despite coming off a recent contract extension, was traded (along with Brad Lukowich) to the San Jose Sharks in exchange for Matt Carle, Ty Wishart, a first-round draft pick in 2009 and a fourth-round pick in 2010. Boyle was pressured to waive his no-trade clause by Tampa Bay's ownership, who said they would otherwise place him on waivers, where he would likely be claimed by the Atlanta Thrashers. In the fallout from the trade, Boyle would call Lightning ownership "liars" for misrepresenting the aforementioned events to the public, while former coach Tortorella later labeled them as "cowboys" and said he had zero respect for them. Frustrated at interference in the team's hockey operations by Barrie and Koules, seven days later, Jay Feaster resigned as general manager, despite having three years remaining on his contract.

The Lightning opened the 2008–09 season in the Czech Republic against the New York Rangers as a part of the NHL's regular-season "Premiere" that selects several teams to open the regular season in Europe.

Barry Melrose would record his first win as a head coach in over 13 years on October 21, 2008, with a 3–2 victory over the Atlanta Thrashers. However, the Lightning did not get off to a great start as hoped, and Melrose was eventually fired by the Lightning with a 5–7–4 record. Rick Tocchet, who had been hired as assistant coach during the previous off-season, was promoted to interim head coach.

On March 4, veterans Mark Recchi and Olaf Kolzig were traded by the Tampa Bay Lightning to the Boston Bruins and Toronto Maple Leafs, respectively. The Lightning acquired top round picks Matt Lashoff and Martins Karsums from the Bruins.

After the firing of Melrose, the Lightning went 19–33–14 and would finish the season 24–40–18 with 66 points, their lowest point total since the 2000–01 season. With the second overall pick in the 2009 NHL Entry Draft, the Lightning selected Swedish defenseman Victor Hedman, who would also be another major part of the franchise for years to come.

In the 2009 off-season, the Lightning removed the interim status of Rick Tocchet, making him the full-time head coach and signing him to a multi-year contract. The Lightning had an up-and-down beginning to the 2009–10 campaign. Despite an overmatched roster on paper, and a team that struggled in the first two periods of many games, the Lightning remained competitive in the playoff race until March, when they went 5–10–1 for the month and fell eight points out of a playoff spot. Unable to make a final push for the playoffs, they were officially eliminated from contention within the first week of April. The Lightning finished the season 34–36–12 for 80 points, fourth in the Southeast Division and 12th in the Eastern Conference.

Steven Stamkos scored 51 goals in just his second NHL season, earning himself a share of the Maurice "Rocket" Richard Trophy by finishing tied for the NHL lead in goals with Pittsburgh Penguins star Sidney Crosby.

During the season, the team was sold to Bostonian investment banker Jeffrey Vinik. Following the late-season collapse, Vinik cleaned house, firing both head coach Rick Tocchet and GM Brian Lawton on April 12, 2010, one day after the season ended.

Arrival of Steve Yzerman
In May 2010, Vinik hired Steve Yzerman away from the Detroit Red Wings front office to be the new GM on a five-year contract. Yzerman then hired Guy Boucher from the Montreal Canadiens organization to succeed Tocchet as the head coach two weeks later.

Yzerman's first off-season with Tampa Bay began with a splash. With the sixth pick of the 2010 NHL Entry Draft, the Lightning selected forward Brett Connolly despite a history of injuries while playing for the Western Hockey League (WHL)'s Prince George Cougars. On July 1, 2010, veteran blueliner Andrej Meszaros was traded to the Philadelphia Flyers in exchange for their second-round pick in 2011. Later that day, the Lightning signed star winger Martin St. Louis to a four-year, $22.5 million contract extension to come into effect on July 1, 2011. On July 19, in another move with the Flyers organization, the Lightning traded defenseman Matt Walker and Tampa Bay's fourth-round pick in 2011 for high-scoring winger Simon Gagne. Other off-season acquisitions included the signing of forwards Sean Bergenheim, Dominic Moore and Marc-Antoine Pouliot, along with defensemen Brett Clark, Randy Jones and Pavel Kubina and goaltender Dan Ellis, as well as the re-signing of restricted free agent forward Steve Downie to a two-year, $3.7 million deal.

With starting goaltender Mike Smith injured, the Lightning called up Cedrick Desjardins, who played with a .950 save percentage and a 1.00 goals against average (GAA) in two games. The team then acquired veteran Dwayne Roloson from the New York Islanders for further coverage in net.

The Lightning compiled a 46–25–11 record with 103 points in the 2010–11 season, matching a franchise record for wins in a season. After holding the first place in the Southeast Division for several months, they fell to second after a poor performance in March. However, their record was solid enough for second in the Southeast Division and fifth in the Eastern Conference, and they returned to the playoffs for the first time since the 2006–07 season. Scoring 31 goals and assisting on 68, Martin St. Louis finished second in the NHL in points.

In the playoffs, Tampa Bay played the Pittsburgh Penguins in the Conference Quarterfinals. After losing Game 4 at home in the second overtime period, they fell behind in the series one game to three. However, the Lightning went on to win the next three games, including a 1–0 Game 7 win on the road, taking their first playoff series since winning the Stanley Cup in 2004. In the Conference Semifinals, the Lightning swept the top-seeded Washington Capitals.

Tampa Bay played the Boston Bruins in the Eastern Conference Finals. In Game 4 of the series, the Lightning trailed 3–0 at the end of the first period. When Dwayne Roloson was pulled for Mike Smith, the Bruins failed to score again, and the Lightning tied the game in the second period by scoring three goals in 3:58, going on to win the game 5–3 and tying the series at two games apiece. The series went the full seven games, though the Lightning were eliminated by a single goal, as the game was lost (0–1).

The Lightning finished the 2011–12 season with a 38–36–8 record. With only 84 points, they fell short of reaching the playoffs, ending the season third in the Southeast Division and tenth in the Eastern Conference.

Individually, Steven Stamkos scored a franchise-record 60 goals. He won the Maurice "Rocket" Richard Trophy for the second time in his career. Stamkos was also second in the NHL in points with 97, and was a finalist for both the Hart Memorial Trophy and the Ted Lindsay Award.

As with the 1994–95 NHL lockout, the 2012–13 NHL lockout resulted in a 48-game season.

Nearing the end of an 18–26–4 season for 40 points, in which the Lightning ended fourth in the Southeast and 14th in the East, GM Steve Yzerman looked to their highly-successful American Hockey League (AHL) affiliate, the Syracuse Crunch. On March 25, 2013, head coach Guy Boucher was dismissed for following a 7–16–1 record. The Lightning announced Jon Cooper would become the eighth head coach in franchise history.

Martin St. Louis won his second Art Ross Trophy with 60 points in the shortened season, as Stamkos finished runner-up 57.

On June 27, 2013, the team announced that they would exercise one of their two "compliance buyouts" on captain Vincent Lecavalier, as permitted by the collective agreement. This move made Lecavalier an unrestricted free agent beginning July 5 of that year. The team stated the move was made not because of Lecavalier's play on the ice, but because of how his contract affected the team's salary cap, which would have been more than $7 million per year until its expiration after the 2019–20 season.

Stamkos–Hedman era (2013–present)
After acquiring goaltender Ben Bishop from the Ottawa Senators in a trade the previous season, the Lightning started the 2013–14 season with an above-average performance. On November 11, 2013, going into the day tied for most goals during the regular season, Steven Stamkos suffered a broken right tibia after crashing into one of the goalposts during play against the Boston Bruins. He would miss 45 games and was not cleared to play again until March 5, 2014.

In January, GM Steve Yzerman, who also served as the general manager for Canada's team at the 2014 Winter Olympics, elected not to name Lightning captain Martin St. Louis to Canada's roster, instead choosing the still-injured Stamkos. After Stamkos was not medically cleared to play in Sochi in early February, Yzerman ultimately named St. Louis to Team Canada as an injury replacement. In late February, it was reported St. Louis had requested a trade from Yzerman the month prior. St. Louis, who had a no-move clause in his contract with Tampa Bay, reportedly consented to only being traded to the New York Rangers. On March 5, 2014, St. Louis was sent to New York along with a conditional 2015 second-round pick in exchange for New York captain Ryan Callahan, a 2015 first-round draft pick, a conditional 2014 second-round pick and a 2015 conditional seventh-round pick. The deal came subsequently after Stamkos had been cleared to return to the Lightning's active roster. St. Louis cited his decision based on his family and thanked Lightning fans for their support during his tenure with the franchise, but would not specify any further about the reasons leading to his request.

On March 6, 2014, Steven Stamkos was named Tampa Bay's 10th captain in his first game back after recovering from a tibia injury.

On April 7, 2014, the team announced it had signed GM Steve Yzerman to a four-year contract extension.
 
Finishing the season with 101 points, the Lightning placed second in the Atlantic Division, qualifying for the playoffs for the first time since 2011. However, Tampa Bay was eliminated in the first round, losing to the Montreal Canadiens in a four-game sweep.

On June 25, 2014, the Lightning agreed to terms with Ryan Callahan, signing him to a six-year, $34.8 million contract extension. The same day, the Lightning used its remaining compliance buyout on forward Ryan Malone after his on-ice performance had declined from injuries seasons prior in addition to his off-ice troubles that included a DUI arrest before the end of the season.

Second Stanley Cup Finals appearance
Finishing the 2014–15 season with 108 points, the Lightning placed second in the Atlantic Division and qualified for the playoffs for the second-straight season, scoring the most goals out of any team in the NHL. Tampa Bay eliminated the Detroit Red Wings in seven games in the first round of the playoffs before facing Montreal in the second round. The Lightning won the first three games of the series and had a chance to sweep the Canadiens; however, Montreal responded with wins in Games 4 and 5 to extend the series to a sixth game. Tampa Bay won the sixth game of the series to eliminate the Canadiens and advance to the Eastern Conference Finals for the first time since 2011, facing the New York Rangers.

In the Eastern Conference Finals, the Lightning and the Rangers split the first two games of the series in New York, with the Lightning winning Game 2 of the series thanks to a Tyler Johnson hat-trick. The series then shifted to Tampa, where the Lightning had a come-from-behind overtime victory in Game 3 but lost Game 4 to even the series at two games apiece. During Game 5 in New York, goaltender Ben Bishop recorded his second shutout of the playoffs in a 2–0 victory, but the Rangers responded in Game 6 by scoring seven goals to tie the series at three games apiece. In Game 7, Bishop recorded his third shutout of the playoffs in another 2–0 victory against the Rangers to lead the Lightning to their first appearance in the Stanley Cup Finals since 2004. The Lightning not only became the first team to defeat the Rangers in a Game 7 at Madison Square Garden, but they also became the first team to successfully defeat three Original Six teams in the first three rounds of the playoffs. The Lightning would face the Chicago Blackhawks in the Stanley Cup Finals, making it the first time a finalist faced four Original Six teams in the playoffs since the four-round format was introduced in 1980. After losing Game 1 at home, the Lightning built a two games to one series lead, though the Blackhawks would win the following three games to win the Stanley Cup in six games at the United Center in Chicago. This made Tampa Bay the first team to beat three of the Original Six teams in the playoffs since the Pittsburgh Penguins completed the feat in 1992. However, they became the first team to lose the Stanley Cup Finals despite beating three Original Six teams.

Conference Finals and continuing contention
The Lightning had a slow start to the 2015–16 season. The season was filled with controversy for the team, starting off with the contractual questions regarding captain Steven Stamkos and with the former third overall pick Jonathan Drouin publicly requesting a trade and being suspended from the organization. The Lightning picked up their play at the beginning of 2016 and set the franchise record to nine consecutive wins on March 5, 2016, when Alex Killorn scored with 42.5 seconds remaining in overtime to propel the Lightning to a 4–3 victory over the Carolina Hurricanes at Amalie Arena. On March 26, 2016, the Lightning announced cornerstone defenseman Anton Stralman had suffered a fractured leg in their game against the New York Islanders at home. Stamkos was out of the lineup for the team's game on April 2 against the New Jersey Devils in Tampa; GM Steve Yzerman announced after the game that the captain would miss one-to-three months due to a blood clot in his arm. Due to unfortunate circumstances, the team had no other option but to bring Drouin back to the team. The Lightning ended up finishing second in the Atlantic Division and would once again face the third-seeded Detroit Red Wings in the first round of the playoffs.

The Lightning defeated the Red Wings in five games after winning 1–0 at Amalie Arena. Next up, the Islanders (who had recently defeated the Panthers to win their first playoff series since the 1992–93 season) would face the Lightning. In Game 1, the Islanders defeated the Bolts 5–3. The Lightning would eventually answer back by winning four consecutive games in the series to defeat the Isles in five games, in large part due to back-to-back road overtime victories with goals scored by Brian Boyle and Jason Garrison. The Lightning were set to play against the Pittsburgh Penguins in the Eastern Conference Finals. In Game 1 at Consol Energy Center, star goaltender Ben Bishop would be added to the list of devastating injuries for the team as he left on a stretcher and did not return for the remainder of the series. Stralman would eventually return in Game 2. A back-and-forth series would eventually lead to a Game 7 showdown in Pittsburgh. Lightning captain Steven Stamkos surprisingly took warmups and was in the Lightning lineup after a long absence from blood clot surgery. However, it was not enough, as the Lightning would fall 2–1 against the Penguins, who went on to defeat the San Jose Sharks and win the Stanley Cup.

With the Lightning under the spotlight in the 2016 off-season, Drouin rescinded his trade request. Steve Yzerman would then announce on June 29 the team re-signed Stamkos to an eight-year, cap-friendly deal. He would then sign star defenseman Victor Hedman to an eight-year contract on July 1, along with a seven-year deal for Alex Killorn and a three-year deal for former first-round pick, goaltender Andrei Vasilevskiy.

The Lightning narrowly missed the playoffs in the 2016–17 season. Finishing with 94 points, they were beaten to the second wildcard by the Toronto Maple Leafs, with 95 points. The 2016–17 season for the Lightning was a host of injuries, mainly their captain, Steven Stamkos. Stamkos went down in the 17th game, against the Detroit Red Wings. It was revealed he suffered from a torn left meniscus, which put him out for the rest of the season. During the season, they traded goaltender Ben Bishop to the Los Angeles Kings, center Brian Boyle to the Toronto Maple Leafs, and forward Valtteri Filppula to the Philadelphia Flyers. However, there were positive signs as winger Nikita Kucherov emerged with 40 goals and goaltender Andrei Vasilevskiy stepped up after Bishop left. The Lightning also showcased their young talent with rookie Brayden Point and promising AHL call-ups Yanni Gourde and Jake Dotchin. The Lightning bounced back with this talent in the last third of the season, but it was not enough as they missed the playoffs by one point.

In the off-season, the Lightning made a deal with the Montreal Canadiens to send Jonathan Drouin to their franchise in exchange for defensive prospect Mikhail Sergachev and a second-round pick in the 2018 NHL Entry Draft. They also signed defenseman Dan Girardi for two years and winger Chris Kunitz to a one-year deal.

In the 2017–18 season, Steven Stamkos returned from injury, scoring 20 points in the first 10 games and assisting on nine of Nikita Kucherov's 11. The Lightning finished the 2017–18 season with a record of 54–23–5, finishing with 113 points. The Lightning won their first Atlantic Division title and first division title since the 2003–04 season, as well as securing the top seed in the Eastern Conference for the 2018 Stanley Cup playoffs. Andrei Vasilevskiy was nominated for the Vezina Trophy. Nikita Kucherov scored 100 points during the regular season, finishing third overall in the league. Steve Yzerman was once again nominated for the NHL General Manager of the Year Award. During the playoffs, the Lightning eliminated the New Jersey Devils in the first round and the Boston Bruins in the second round, both in five games. However, they were defeated in the Eastern Conference Finals by the eventual Stanley Cup champions, the Washington Capitals, in seven games.

Record-breaking season marred by playoff failure
On September 11, 2018, it was announced that Steve Yzerman would be resigning from his position as general manager, and Julien BriseBois would be currently taking his place. During the 2018–19 season, the Lightning clinched their first Presidents' Trophy and second consecutive division title after a 4–1 win over the Arizona Coyotes. Winning their final regular season game against the Boston Bruins, the Lightning finished with 62 wins, tying the  NHL record set by the 1995–96 Detroit Red Wings for most wins in a season. Nikita Kucherov became the second player in Lightning franchise history (after Martin St. Louis) to win the Hart Memorial Trophy as the league's most valuable player and the Art Ross Trophy as the league's leading point scorer, setting a new franchise record of 128 points. Andrei Vasilevskiy became the first player in franchise history to win the Vezina Trophy as the league's best goaltender. However, in the first round of the playoffs, they were swept in four games by the Columbus Blue Jackets, becoming the first Presidents' Trophy winner to be swept in the first round of the playoffs. The series is widely regarded as one of the biggest upsets in league history. Jeremy Roenick of NBC Sports described Tampa's elimination as "one of the biggest letdowns in history", while the Tampa Bay Times described it as "the disappointment that all others are measured against".

Back-to-back Stanley Cup championships and three straight Finals appearances 
Following their earlier than expected exit from the playoffs, several players left the Lightning. Left winger J. T. Miller was traded to the Vancouver Canucks. Backup goaltender Louis Domingue was dealt to the New Jersey Devils for a conditional seventh-round draft pick in 2021. Defenseman Anton Stralman signed a three-year contract with the Florida Panthers. Right winger Ryan Callahan's career was effectively ended when he was diagnosed with a degenerative back disease. The Lightning signed defenseman Kevin Shattenkirk to a one-year contract, after his contract with the New York Rangers was bought out. Left winger Patrick Maroon, who was coming off a Stanley Cup championship with the St. Louis Blues, was also signed to a one-year deal. The Lightning re-signed centers Cedric Paquette and Brayden Point to two and three-year contracts, respectively. Goaltender Andrei Vasilevskiy's contract was extended by eight years.

The Lightning began the season with a 17–13–4 record after 34 games. After this point, they won 23 of their next 26 games, including two separate win streaks of at least ten games, the second of which eventually set a new franchise record of eleven consecutive wins. They lost captain Steven Stamkos to injury once again, as he underwent surgery to repair a core muscle in March. He was expected to miss 6–8 weeks as a result, which at the time was expected to keep him out for the remainder of the regular season and the start of the playoffs.

Tampa Bay had only played 70 games when the NHL suspended the season on March 12, 2020, due to concerns over the COVID-19 pandemic. It was not until late May that the league decided to cancel the remainder of the regular season. At the time, the Lightning had a record of 43–21–6 and were second in their conference. To finish the season the league expanded the 2020 Stanley Cup playoffs to include 24 teams. In July, it was announced that the playoffs would begin August 1, and would take place in the Canadian cities of Toronto as the Eastern Conference hub, and Edmonton for the Western Conference. By virtue of having one of the top four highest point percentages at the time the season was suspended, the Lightning not only qualified for the playoffs, but would first compete in a single round-robin opening round group with the Boston Bruins, Washington Capitals, and Philadelphia Flyers to determine seeding. Winning two out of three games, the Lightning earned the second seed in the East.

Following the round-robin, the Lightning drew the Columbus Blue Jackets again in the first round. The first game of the series ultimately became the fourth-longest NHL game in history, as the game-winning goal was scored by Brayden Point at the 10:27 mark of the fifth overtime period. Point also scored in overtime for a second time in game five, eliminating Columbus. In the second round, the Lightning faced the Boston Bruins. After losing the first game of this series, the Lightning rallied to win the next four, with Victor Hedman's double-overtime goal in game 5 sealing the series victory for Tampa Bay. After advancing, the remainder of the Lightning's playoff run took place in Edmonton, which had been planned as the site of both of the Conference Finals and the Stanley Cup Finals. In the Eastern Conference Finals, the Lightning took on the New York Islanders. The Islanders extended the Lightning to six games, but Tampa Bay would once again prevail in overtime to win the series, with the game-winning goal this time being scored by Anthony Cirelli. The win earned the Lightning the Prince of Wales Trophy for the third time in their history, and their first trip to the Stanley Cup Finals since 2015.

In the 2020 Stanley Cup Finals, the Lightning met the Dallas Stars. The teams split the first two games of the series. In game three, Steven Stamkos returned to the lineup, having missed the entire playoff run to that point after suffering an injury prior to the start of the playoffs, unrelated to an injury he sustained during the regular season. He scored a goal on what was his only shot on goal of the series, as he did not take to the ice again following the end of the first period. Tampa Bay did, however, win both game three and four to take a 3–1 series lead. Dallas stayed alive in the series by winning game five in double-overtime, but the Lightning closed them out with a 2–0 win in game six to win their second Stanley Cup championship, and first since 2004.

Victor Hedman was named the Conn Smythe Trophy winner as the MVP of the playoffs, having recorded 22 points on 10 goals and 12 assists. Nikita Kucherov set a new franchise record for points in a single playoff season with 34, and also became the franchise leader for playoff goals, assists, and points. The team set a league record with over 221 minutes played in overtime periods alone. They also became the first team in league history to have three series-winning goals in overtime. Andrei Vasilevskiy surpassed both former Lightning goalies Ben Bishop and Nikolai Khabibulin to become the franchise leader in playoff games played and playoff games won.

The victory led to a new tradition for Tampa Bay sports teams: boat parades. The 2020 Lightning held a parade of boats on the Hillsborough River rather than a traditional victory parade through the streets of the city, mainly to comply with COVID-19 regulations, but subsequent championship teams in Tampa have held similar parades even with those restrictions lifted.

Due to COVID-19, the league moved the Lightning to the Central Division, where they would compete with the Blackhawks, Blue Jackets, Hurricanes, Panthers, Predators, Red Wings, and Stars for the 2020–21 season. The Lightning would only play against teams in the Central Division, with limited attendance to start the season. The team once again played in a shortened season, playing 56 games in total. Nikita Kucherov would miss the entire regular season with a hip surgery he had in December 2020. During the season, the Lightning acquired defenseman David Savard through a multi-team trade with the Columbus Blue Jackets and the Detroit Red Wings. The Lightning would also acquire defenseman Fredrik Claesson in another trade with the San Jose Sharks. The Lightning finished the season with a 36–17–3 record, and would finish 3rd in the Central Division.

Entering the playoffs, the Lightning would face against the Florida Panthers in the first round, making this the first time the state rivals would meet each other in the playoffs. The Lightning would win the series 4–2, with the last game continuing a playoff series clinching shutout streak that had carried over from the 2020 Stanley Cup Finals against Dallas. In the second round, the Lightning would face the Carolina Hurricanes. In the third game of the series, Brayden Point would score the first goal in a playoff goal-scoring streak that would last for 9 games, coming in second to Reggie Leach with 10 games in a single playoff year. The Hurricanes would win game 3 in overtime, however the Lightning would win the next two games to win the series 4–1. For the second consecutive year, the Lightning would again face the New York Islanders before heading to the Stanley Cup Finals. Due to the lack of conferences for this season, this series would not be called the "2021 Eastern Conference Finals", but instead it would be known as the "2021 Stanley Cup Semifinals". The Islanders would once again take the Lightning to an extended series, having won game 6 in overtime to force the series to 7 games. However, the Lightning would clinch the series in game 7 with a single shorthanded goal scored by Yanni Gourde. The win would earn the Lightning their second consecutive Prince of Wales Trophy, and a trip to the Stanley Cup Finals.

In the 2021 Stanley Cup Finals, the Lightning went up against the Montreal Canadiens. In the first three games, the Lightning would prevail, a notable highlight being the diving goal Blake Coleman would score with 1.1 seconds left in the second period in the second game in the series. The Canadiens however would force a game 5 and prevent a sweep, winning game 4 in overtime. The Lightning however would win the Stanley Cup  in game 5, with a single goal scored by Ross Colton in the second period. The game would also see the Lightning win in their own arena, the second time in team history, and the first time since the Chicago Blackhawks won the Cup in 2015. Andrei Vasilevskiy won the Conn Smythe Trophy with 5 shutouts during the playoffs, 4 of which were series-clinching shutouts. Patrick Maroon would win his third consecutive Stanley Cup, one with the St. Louis Blues and two with the Lightning. Maroon later slipped and dropped the Stanley Cup and severely dented the trophy's bowl during a celebration at Julian B. Lane Park following the team's victory parade on July 11. Maroon cited the strong thunderstorm during the outdoor celebration as the reason, and the Cup was quickly repaired with no further issues.

On February 26, 2022, the Lightning played their first outdoor game in franchise history against the host Nashville Predators in the 2022 NHL Stadium Series at Nissan Stadium. The Lightning would win the game against the Predators with a score of 3–2, with Steven Stamkos receiving first star. On April 14, 2022, the Lightning clinched a playoff berth after a 4–3 overtime win against the Anaheim Ducks. In the 2022 playoffs, the Lightning defeated the Toronto Maple Leafs in seven games in the First Round and swept their in-state rivals in the Second Round. On June 11, 2022, the Lightning clinched their third straight Stanley Cup Finals berth after a 2–1 win against the New York Rangers in game six of the Eastern Conference Finals. However, in the 2022 Finals, they came up short for a third consecutive Stanley Cup title, in game six against the Colorado Avalanche on June 26.

Radio and television
The Lightning's flagship radio outlet is WHPT, which replaced WFLA as of the 2022–23 NHL season. Dave Mishkin serves as play-by-play announcer, joined by Phil Esposito as color commentator for home games. Greg Lenelli is the pregame and intermission host. The Lightning television broadcasts can be seen on Bally Sports Sun. From 1995 to 2020, the television play-by-play announcer was Rick Peckham. He announced that he would be retiring following the 2019–20 season. His final game for the Lightning was game five of their First Round series during the 2020 Stanley Cup playoffs, in which the Lightning won in overtime to win the series. Dave Randorf was named as his replacement prior to the 2020–21 season. The color commentator is Brian Engblom. The studio host is Paul Kennedy. Caley Chelios, daughter of Hall of Fame defenseman Chris Chelios, is the in-arena host and Lightning reporter. Former Lightning player Dave Andreychuk and former color commentator Bobby "The Chief" Taylor assist with the television pregame and postgame broadcasts.

On December 10, 2014, long-time color commentator Bobby "The Chief" Taylor announced he would be retiring from the broadcast booth at the end of the 2014–15 season. Taylor had served as the team's color commentator since the 1993–94 season, which was the team's second year of existence. Taylor cited that he desired to be home with his wife Jan more. Taylor said, "The road was starting to get a little stale," and "I've been traveling since I was 15, and that's a long time." However, Taylor announced that he was not completely stepping away from the team broadcasts. He has continued to serve as a studio analyst during the games on Fox Sports Sun for both home and away games.

On August 11, 2015, Fox Sports Sun, the regional television home of the Lightning, announced Brian Engblom as Taylor's replacement on color commentary for the 2015–16 season. Prior to joining Sun Sports, Engblom served as the "inside the glass" analyst on both NBC and NBC Sports Network, as well as the network's coverage of the 2014 Winter Olympics in Sochi, Russia. Engblom has served as an analyst on NHL Live, and also served as color analyst for Winnipeg Jets games on TSN in Canada. Prior to being an announcer, Engblom played at the University of Wisconsin, and was Montreal's third pick, 22nd overall, in the 1975 NHL Amateur Draft. He won three Stanley Cups with the Canadiens from 1977 to 1979.

Team colors and mascot
Since 2010, the Lightning colors have been blue, black and white. Their logo has been a stylized lightning bolt. This is the origin of one nickname for the team—the "Bolts."

Logo and jerseys

The original Lightning jerseys featured simple stripes on the sleeves and tail, and contrasting shoulders—black shoulders over a white jersey, and white shoulders over the black—with the alternate logo (a lightning bolt over the outline of the state of Florida). The underarm gussets included a feature referred to as "victory stripes"—a group of thin stripes, alternating in the team's colors (black-silver-blue on white, or white-blue-silver on black). For the 1996–97 season, the Lightning added a third jersey, primarily blue with a sublimated wave and rain design on the front and back, lightning bolts down the sleeves, a silver-gray shoulder yoke, and black gussets. The third jersey was retired after the 1998–99 season.

In their first two seasons, the Lightning used a stylized block font for player names, with gaps in the upper loops of letters such as A, B, D, and R. The numbers were standard block numbers with drop shadows. The fonts were vertical in 1992–93, and italicized in 1993–94. The following season, the name font changed to a block font, vertically arched, while the number font changed to a painted style resembling the letters "Tampa Bay" in the logo. This style was also used on the blue alternate in 1998–99, replacing an "electrified" number font used from 1996 to 1998. In 2001–02, the old fonts were replaced with traditional block letters and numbers, which have been used ever since. They also darkened their shades of blue that season from a royal blue to a speed (Indy) blue.

As with all NHL teams for the 2007–08 season, the Lightning debuted in new Reebok "Rbk Edge" jerseys. Also, like several other NHL teams, the Lightning updated their team logo.

The Lightning unveiled their new logo on August 25, 2007. The logo was similar to the inaugural one, but with a more modern look. The new logo also kept the same theme as the previous one, but with the words "Tampa Bay" across the top now appearing with tall capital initials, and the word "Lightning" no longer appearing on the bottom of the logo.

 
The Edge jerseys use the same template adopted by the Ottawa Senators and Pittsburgh Penguins. Unlike those teams, the Lightning's elbow panels remain the base color of the jersey, and an additional blue panel is added near the cuff of the sleeve. The Edge uniforms retain the underarm gusset "victory stripes" of their predecessors.

The Lightning then debuted a new "alternate" or "third" jersey in the 2008–09 season. The jersey features a dominant "electric blue" color, with black and silver accents at the end of the sleeves. The logo is removed, and in its place emblazoned across the front of the jersey descending to the lower left of the jersey is the word "BOLTS" (utilizing a layout similar to that of the Ottawa Senators' third jersey). The numbers are featured on the back and sleeves only, using white lettering.

It was reported on January 23, 2011, that the Lightning had filed paperwork with the NHL to change their logo and colors, beginning with the 2011–12 season. The new logo, as well as the new home and away jerseys, were unveiled by the team at a press conference at the St. Pete Times Forum on January 31, 2011. The Lightning began to integrate the new logo onto center ice, and even distributed free T-shirts with the simplified logo on February 4, 2011, while still using the old Lightning logo and uniforms.

The current uniforms are made in a traditional hockey sweater design. Initially, the colors that were to be used were simply blue and white, but by popular demand, black was later added as a trim color on the numbers. The victory stripes were also eliminated. Despite the introduction of the new uniforms, the previous third jersey was retained, with the new simplified logo replacing the old logo in the shoulders prior to the 2012–13 season.

For the 2014–15 season, the Lightning announced that a new black third sweater will replace the existing "BOLTS" sweaters. The new sweaters were unveiled on September 27, 2014. It retained the "BOLTS" wordmark, while adding white accents in a similar manner as the Los Angeles Kings' sweaters. The secondary roundel logo also replaced the primary logo on the sleeves, while the metro name was enscripted on the collar.

The Lightning made some minor tweaks to their current uniform set following the NHL's move to Adidas as its uniform provider in the 2017–18 season. The most notable change is the removal of the "TAMPA BAY" wordmark on the white away sweaters.

A third sweater was not used during all of 2017–18 and much of the 2018–19 season. On February 7, 2019, the Lightning unveiled a new black uniform, lacking any blue and white elements and featuring sublimated black and grey patterns on the sleeves, socks and back numbers.

For the 2020–21 season, the Lightning released a "Reverse Retro" uniform, using the design they wore from 2001 to 2007. Unlike the originals, blue served as the base color while black was relegated to trim color. Their 2022–23 "Reverse Retro" uniform used the design of the third jersey from 1996 to 1999, but with a white base.

For the 2022 NHL Stadium Series, the Lightning unveiled a white uniform with a stylized blue stripe shaped like a thunderbolt at the bottom. An updated rendition of the "BOLTS" wordmark was stitched in front, and numbers featured pointed accents.

In-game personalities
Greg Wolf has been the Lightning’s in-game host since the 2006-2007 season.

Retired United States Air Force Technical Sergeant Sonya Bryson-Kirksey sings the Canadian and American national anthems at most home games. She started singing the US national anthem for the team in 2013, and the Canadian anthem in 2020. She is accompanied on game nights by organist, Krystof Srebrakowski.

ThunderBug
The Lightning mascot is a lightning bug named ThunderBug, who performs at games and makes appearances in the community.

Lightning Girls
Until the 2019–20 season, an official dance team known as the Lightning Girls performed at all home games and community events. The Tampa Bay Lightning Girls were a group of dancers who performed in the stands.

Season-by-season record
This is a partial list of the last five seasons completed by the Lightning. For the full season-by-season history, see List of Tampa Bay Lightning seasons

Note: GP = Games played, W = Wins, L = Losses, T = Ties, OTL = Overtime Losses, Pts = Points, GF = Goals for, GA = Goals against

Players

Current roster

Retired numbers

 The NHL retired Wayne Gretzky's No. 99 for all its member teams at the 2000 NHL All-Star Game.

Team captains

Paul Ysebaert, 1995–1997
Mikael Renberg, 1997–1998
Rob Zamuner, 1998–1999
Bill Houlder, 1999
Chris Gratton, 1999–2000
Vincent Lecavalier, 2000–2001
Dave Andreychuk, 2002–2006
Tim Taylor, 2006–2008
Vincent Lecavalier, 2008–2013
Martin St. Louis, 2013–2014
Steven Stamkos, 2014–present

Honored members

NHL All-Star team
2003–04 – first team: Martin St. Louis
2017–18 – first team: Victor Hedman, Nikita Kucherov
2018–19 – first team: Nikita Kucherov, Andrei Vasilevskiy
2020–21 – first team: Andrei Vasilevskiy
2006–07 – second team: Martin St. Louis, Vincent Lecavalier, Dan Boyle
2009–10 – second team: Martin St. Louis
2010–11 – second team: Martin St. Louis, Steven Stamkos
2011–12 – second team: Steven Stamkos
2012–13 – second team: Martin St. Louis
2015–16 – second team: Ben Bishop
2016–17 – second team: Victor Hedman, Nikita Kucherov 
2018–19 – second team: Victor Hedman
2019–20 – second team: Victor Hedman, Nikita Kucherov
2020–21 – second team: Victor Hedman
2021–22 – second team: Victor Hedman

NHL All-Rookie Team
Brad Richards: 2000–01
Tyler Johnson: 2013–14
Ondrej Palat: 2013–14
Anthony Cirelli: 2018–19

All-Star Game

Ben Bishop, G: 2016
Brian Bradley, C: 1993, 1994
Dino Ciccarelli, RW: 1997
Wendel Clark, LW: 1999
Jon Cooper, HC: 2018, 2019
Roman Hamrlik, D: 1996
Victor Hedman, D: 2017, 2018, 2020, 2022
Tyler Johnson, C: 2015
Nikolai Khabibulin, G: 2002, 2003
Pavel Kubina, D: 2004
Nikita Kucherov, RW: 2017, 2018, 2019, 2023
Vincent Lecavalier, C: 2003, 2007, 2008 (captain), 2009
Fredrik Modin, LW: 2001
Brayden Point, C: 2018
Martin St. Louis, RW: 2003, 2004, 2007, 2008, 2009, 2011 (alternate captain)
Steven Stamkos, C: 2011, 2012, 2015, 2016, 2018 (captain), 2019, 2022
Petr Svoboda, D: 2000
Andrei Vasilevskiy, G: 2018, 2019, 2020, 2022, 2023

NHL YoungStars Game
Brad Richards, C: 2002
Alexander Svitov, C: 2003
Paul Ranger, D: 2007
Mike Lundin, D: 2008
Steven Stamkos, C: 2009

NHL All-Star Skills Competition (Rookie)
Jonathan Drouin, LW: 2015

First-round draft picks

1992: Roman Hamrlik (1st overall)
1993: Chris Gratton (3rd overall)
1994: Jason Wiemer (8th overall)
1995: Daymond Langkow (5th overall)
1996: Mario Larocque (16th overall)
1997: Paul Mara (7th overall)
1998: Vincent Lecavalier (1st overall)
1999: None
2000: Nikita Alexeev (8th overall)
2001: Alexander Svitov (3rd overall)
2002: None

2003: None
2004: Andy Rogers (30th overall)
2005: Vladimir Mihalik (30th overall)
2006: Riku Helenius (15th overall)
2007: None
2008: Steven Stamkos (1st overall)
2009: Victor Hedman (2nd overall), Carter Ashton (29th overall)
2010: Brett Connolly (6th overall)
2011: Vladislav Namestnikov (27th overall)
2012: Slater Koekkoek (10th overall), Andrei Vasilevskiy (19th overall)

2013: Jonathan Drouin (3rd overall)
2014: Anthony DeAngelo (19th overall)
2015: None
2016: Brett Howden (27th overall)
2017: Cal Foote (14th overall) 
2018: None
2019: Nolan Foote (27th overall)
2020: None
2021: None
2022: Isaac Howard (31st overall)

Franchise scoring leaders
These are the top-ten-point-scorers in franchise history. Figures are updated after each completed NHL regular season.
  – current Lightning player
Note: Pos = Position; GP = Games Played; G = Goals; A = Assists; Pts = Points; P/G = Points per game

Franchise playoff scoring leaders
These are the top-ten playoff point-scorers in franchise playoff history. Figures are updated after each completed NHL season.
  – current Lightning player
Note: Pos = Position; GP = Games Played; G = Goals; A = Assists; Pts = Points; P/G = Points per game; * = current Lightning player

NHL awards and trophies

Stanley Cup
2003–04, 2019–20, 2020–21

Presidents' Trophy
2018–19

Prince of Wales Trophy
2003–04, 2014–15, 2019–20, 2020–21, 2021–22

Art Ross Trophy
Martin St. Louis: 2003–04, 2012–13
Nikita Kucherov: 2018–19

Bill Masterton Memorial Trophy
John Cullen: 1998–99

Conn Smythe Trophy
Brad Richards: 2003–04
Victor Hedman: 2019–20
Andrei Vasilevskiy: 2020–21

Foster Hewitt Memorial Award
Rick Peckham: 2020

Hart Memorial Trophy
Martin St. Louis: 2003–04
Nikita Kucherov: 2018–19

Jack Adams Award
John Tortorella: 2003–04

James Norris Memorial Trophy
Victor Hedman: 2017–18

King Clancy Memorial Trophy
Vincent Lecavalier: 2007–08

Lady Byng Memorial Trophy
Brad Richards: 2003–04
Martin St. Louis: 2009–10, 2010–11, 2012–13

Lester B. Pearson Award/Ted Lindsay Award
Martin St. Louis: 2003–04
Nikita Kucherov: 2018–19

Maurice "Rocket" Richard Trophy
Vincent Lecavalier: 2006–07
Steven Stamkos: 2009–10, 2011–12

NHL Foundation Player Award
Vincent Lecavalier: 2007–08

Jim Gregory General Manager of the Year Award
Steve Yzerman: 2014–15

NHL Plus/Minus Award
Martin St. Louis: 2003–04

Vezina Trophy
Andrei Vasilevskiy: 2018–19

Franchise records

Individual

Most goals in a season: Steven Stamkos, 60 (2011–12)
Most assists in a season: Nikita Kucherov, 87 (2018–19)
Most points in a season: Nikita Kucherov, 128 (2018–19)
Most goals in a season, defenseman: Dan Boyle (2006–07), Victor Hedman (2021–22), 20
Most assists in a season, defenseman: Victor Hedman, 65 (2021–22)
Most points in a season, defenseman: Victor Hedman, 85 (2021–22)
Most penalty minutes in a season: Zenon Konopka, 265 (2009–10)
Most goals in a season, rookie: Yanni Gourde, 25 (2017–18)
Most assists in a season, rookie: Brad Richards, 41 (2000–01)
Most points in a season, rookie: Yanni Gourde, 64 (2017–18)
Most wins in a season: Andrei Vasilevskiy, 44 (2017–18)
Most shutouts in a season: Andrei Vasilevskiy, 8 (2017–18)

Team
Largest home playoff attendance: 28,183 (ThunderDome – now Tropicana Field) (1995–96)
Largest home regular season attendance: 27,227 (ThunderDome) (1993–94)
Most points in a season: 128 (2018–19)
Most wins in a season: 62 (2018–19)
Most home wins in a season: 32 (2014–15 and 2018–19)
Most road wins in a season: 30 (2018–19)
Most wins in a row: 11 (2019–20)

See also
List of Stanley Cup champions
List of National Hockey League awards

Notes

References

External links

 

 
National Hockey League teams
1992 establishments in Florida
Atlantic Division (NHL)
Ice hockey clubs established in 1992
Ice hockey teams in Florida
National Hockey League in Florida
Sports in St. Petersburg, Florida
Sports teams in Tampa, Florida